The 2022–23 Columbia Lions women's basketball team represents Columbia University during the 2022–23 NCAA Division I women's basketball season. The Lions, led by seventh-year head coach Megan Griffith, play their home games at Levien Gymnasium and are members of the Ivy League. They finished the Ivy League season 12–2, winning a share of the title for the first time in program history. Columbia was the No. 2 seed at the 2023 Ivy League women's basketball tournament, but they fell to Harvard in the semifinals. After being the first team left out of the NCAA Tournament field, the Lions accepted an auto-bid to the 2023 WNIT.

Previous season
They finished the previous season 25–7, 12–2 in Ivy League play. They lost to Princeton in the 2022 Ivy League women's basketball tournament finals.

Roster

Schedule

|-
!colspan=9 style=| Non-conference regular season

|-
!colspan=9 style=| Ivy League regular season

|-
!colspan=9 style=| Ivy League Tournament

|-
!colspan=9 style=| WNIT

Rankings

The Coaches Poll did not release a poll for the week of November 7.

See also
 2022–23 Columbia Lions men's basketball team

References 

Columbia Lions women's basketball seasons
Columbia
Columbia
Columbia